Savera Nadeem is a Pakistani actress, producer and director. Primarily known for her work in television, she also acted in theatre and films. Nadeem is the recipient of a Lux Style Award for Best Television Actress out of five nominations.

Early life
Savera Nadeem was born in 1974 to Kashmiri family in Lahore. Her father, Shahid Nadeem, is a prominent journalist. She has a Masters in English Literature from Kinnaird College, Lahore, and studied directing at the National School of Drama, Delhi. Nadeem also has a background in classical music.

Career

Acting
Savera Nadeem started acting when she was fifteen with her first drama, Kiran, being broadcast in 1989 on Pakistan television. She subsequently had the lead role in the drama serial Inkaar.

Producer and director
Nadeem's first job as director was on Kal, a telefilm that shown on PTV and Geo TV. Subsequently, she directed thirteen episodes of Qurbaton Ke Silsilay, a drama shown on PTV.

Filmography

Films

Television

Web series

Talkshows
Nadeem was the presenter of AAJ TV's morning show AAJ SUBH from 27 September 2010 to 16 September 2011.

Awards

Lux Style Awards

See also
 List of Lollywood actors

References

External links
 

1974 births
20th-century Pakistani actresses
21st-century Pakistani actresses
Actresses from Lahore
Kinnaird College for Women University alumni
Living people
Pakistani people of Kashmiri descent
Pakistani television actresses
Pakistani television directors
Punjabi people
People from Lahore
Women television directors
PTV Award winners